I Don't Kiss is a 1991 French drama film directed by André Téchiné, starring Manuel Blanc, Emmanuelle Béart and Philippe Noiret. The plot follows a young man who leaves his provincial home in the Pyrenees, going to Paris, hoping to become an actor.  A promising beginning is followed by disillusionment and he ends on the street as a prostitute.
The film is a grim, melancholic portrait of a young man searching and failing to find meaning in his life. The film had a total of 472,187 admissions in France.

Plot
Pierre, an idealistic twenty-year-old man, leaves his home in a remote district of the Pyrenees to travel to Paris, hoping to break away from his restrictive provincial life.  Arriving in the French capital, he turns to the only person he knows in the city, Evelyne, a middle aged nurse, whom he had briefly met when working as a stretcher-bearer at Lourdes. She is vague and distracted, being preoccupied by the paralyzed mother with whom she lives. Nevertheless, she manages to get Pierre a job in the kitchen of a hospital. He finds somewhere to stay and, in order to fulfill his childhood dream, buys a book on how to become an actor.

A colleague at work, Said, takes him to dinner with two middle-aged men: they are both gay. The cellist, Dimitri, is Said's lover, and the intellectual television personality, Romain, is fascinated by Pierre but insists his interest is platonic. Pierre is disgusted by the evening and when Romain gives him a ride home and stops in a park that is a pick up point for hustlers, he walks off in a huff, refusing to get back into Romain's car.  Evelyne takes Pierre to an expensive restaurant to make up for her earlier indifference. They return to her house and spend the night together. She offers him free accommodation, he moves in and they start an affair.

Pierre begins to attend acting classes but shows little talent. When he has to prepare for "Hamlet", he recites the role with no feelings and even forgets his lines. Humiliated, he flees in abandonment from his tentative ambition to become an actor.

His relationship with Evelyne also comes to an abrupt end. She feels that he does not really love her and breaks away from him. When she leaves him some money, Pierre feels insulted, returns the money, and leaves the place she had offered him. He goes absent from work pleading illness and eventually loses his job. Homeless and forced to sleep on the streets, he falls victim to thieves who steal all his belongings. Now broke and homeless, Pierre returns to the park where Romain took him in, and sees him again. Pierre's offer of sexual favors is refused, but Romain takes him on a trip to Spain. In Seville, the older man takes someone else as a lover and Pierre returns to Paris.

With no job or home, Pierre has to adopt prostitution as his only way to make money. He makes his rules very clear to prospective male clients: "I don't kiss, I don't suck, I don't get fucked". Despite his initial aversion to sex with men, Pierre manages to make a success of his new career. During a police crackdown on streetwalkers, he meets Ingrid, another prostitute. He becomes infatuated with Ingrid, whose dream had been to become a singer. Both are arrested and after a night in jail, they spend an idyllic day together. They make love, but their liaison is discovered by her pimp, who with his gang beats up and rapes Pierre, forcing Ingrid to watch.

Pierre leaves Paris and joins the paratroops; he  voices to an interviewing officer a desire for revenge, and also for the "leap into the void" involved in parachuting at night. On a visit home, he tells his brother that he did not hate the city, he just was not ready for it. On release from his service, and about to leave once again for Paris and an open future, Pierre stops off at the beach, takes his clothes off and wanders into the sea.

Cast
 Manuel Blanc as Pierre
 Philippe Noiret as Romain
 Emmanuelle Béart as Ingrid
 Hélène Vincent as Evelyne
 Ivan Desny as Dimitri
 Roschdy Zem as Saïd
 Christophe Bernard as Le Mac
 Michèle Moretti as The Drama teacher

Analysis
The film is a bleak, melancholic portrait of a young man searching and failing to find meaning in his life. The film's fragmented narrative structure and uneven rhythm added to the sense of insecurity experienced by the central character. At the same time, the moody photography – particularly the intense nocturnal scenes – lend an atmosphere of cruel oppression and dark poetry, recurring motifs in Téchiné's appealing style of cinema.

Production

Téchiné's ninth feature was filmed after a four-year gap since he made his previous film.  I Don't Kiss was based on a story by Téchiné's collaborator Jacques Nolot, with dialogue by Téchiné, Nolot, and the writer Michel Grisolia.

DVD release
The film was released on DVD July 22, 2008 in the U.S. as part of a Boxset of Téchiné's films. The film is in  French with English and Spanish subtitles. I Don't Kiss is also available in Region 2  DVD.

Notes

References
Marshall, Bill. André Téchiné. Manchester University Press, 2007,

External links
 

1991 drama films
1991 films
Films directed by André Téchiné
Films scored by Philippe Sarde
French drama films
1990s French-language films
French LGBT-related films
Films about prostitution in Paris
Films about male prostitution in France
1990s French films